Uthwatt is a surname. Notable people with the surname include:

Augustus Uthwatt, Baron Uthwatt PC, QC (1879–1949), Australian-British judge
William Uthwatt (1882–1952), priest of the Church of England

See also
Huthwaite
Outhwaite (disambiguation)